The 2002 Nordea Nordic Light Open was a women's tennis tournament played on outdoor clay courts that was part of the Tier IV  category of the 2002 WTA Tour. It was the inaugural edition of the tournament and took place in Espoo, Finland from 5 August until 11 August 2002. Qualifier Svetlana Kuznetsova won the singles title and earned $22,000 first-prize money.

Finals

Singles
 Svetlana Kuznetsova defeated  Denisa Chládková, 0–6, 6–3, 7–6(7–2)
 It was Kuznetsova's first singles title of her career.

Doubles
 Svetlana Kuznetsova /  Arantxa Sánchez Vicario defeated  Eva Bes-Ostariz /  María José Martínez Sánchez, 6–3, 6–7(5–7), 6–3

References

External links
 ITF tournament edition details
 Tournament draws

Nordea Nordic Light Open
2002
2002 in Finnish sport
August 2002 sports events in Europe